is a 2013 Japanese film directed, written and scored by Sion Sono.

The movie is an action film based on a screenplay written by Sono fifteen years earlier. North American distributor Drafthouse Films announced its acquisition before it made its world premiere at the 2013 Venice Film Festival, planning a 2014 release in theatres and VOD after its premiere at the 2013 Toronto International Film Festival. At Toronto the film won the People's Choice Award in the Midnight Madness section.

Plot
Four teenagers who are passionate about cinema, including wannabe director Hirata, meet a young thug named Sasaki who they see as a potential Japanese Bruce Lee. They form the movie club "Fuck Bombers" with the blessing of an elderly projectionist specialized in 35mm film. 

In the meantime, a yakuza war rages. Boss Muto grapples with the assassins of a rival gang who invaded his home to attack his wife. To defend herself, she kills almost all of them and ends up in prison. The only survivor, Ikegami, has a brief encounter with Mitsuko, the 10-year-old daughter of Muto and child star of a toothbrush commercial. Escaping from the crime scene and covered in blood, Ikegami is filmed by the enthusiastic Fuck Bombers. Muto's yakuza clan defeats the rival group by killing their boss. Ikegami becomes the defeated clan's new boss and proposes a truce. He turns his gang headquarters into a castle inspired by samurai films, with all the criminals wearing kimonos. Meanwhile, the Fuck Bombers leave a prayer to the God of Cinema at a small shrine in the hopes that one day they will make a movie that will be remembered forever.

10 years pass and their mission seems to have failed. The Fuck Bombers film club was abandoned and the projectionist has died. Sasaki feeling hopeless and depressed about having not made a successful movie, abandons his friends. Meanwhile, the war between Muto's yakuza and Ikegami's yakuza has continued. Mitsuko, now an actress, has run away from her current project, a film whose production began to impress Muto's wife, who is about to be released from prison. While being chased, Mitsuko hides in a phone booth and finds Koji, who has been in love with her since he saw her commercial on TV as a child. She hires him to be her "lover" for a day and drags him along into her violent adventures. Muto is informed by the director of Mitsuko's movie that they cannot wait for her any longer, and they hire a replacement actress. Desperate, Muto rents his own film equipment and builds a set with his subordinates. One of them suggests that, to kill two birds with one stone, the film could be built around their inevitable confrontation with Ikegami.

When Muto's men find Mitsuko, they mistakenly think that Koji convinced her to escape and that he is her boyfriend. They beat him up and bring him in front of the boss, but Mitsuko saves him by saying that he is a director and that he can be useful.  Koji escapes and finds himself in front of the shrine where he begins vomiting so profusely that it reveals the prayer left by the Fuck Bombers. Koji and Mitsuko decide to contact Hirata and, while giving him few details about the project, Hirata immediately agrees as soon as they say they have the money and the 35mm film. Hirata rekindles his friendship with Sasaki and meets the rest of Muto's yakuza, who have now become a semi-professional crew. Hirata convinces Ikegami, who is lost in an irrational love for Mitsuko, to approve this cinematic operation. Ikegami, remembering when he met the Fuck Bombers 10 years ago, accepts the offer. Hirata insists, for dramatic purposes, that all men are armed only with katanas.

The fight begins. In the massacre, Muto is decapitated and Koji's hand is chopped off. Koji and Mitsuko confess their mutual love before a katana is lodged in his head. As revenge for the death of his boss, one of Muto's men shoots Ikegami with a gun, and the massacre gets out of control as the rival yakuza clans begin shooting each other. The steadycam and trolley operator begin shooting everyone without distinction, but they both die behind the camera. Suddenly the police arrive and kill Koji, Ikegami, Mitsuko, and then Sasaki. While the police slaughter the remaining survivors, Hirata gets up from the pile of corpses and begins to retrieve all the rolls of film from the cameras scattered around Ikegami's castle. Hysterical and covered with blood, he runs through the streets, shouting "Fuck Bombers!" and "We have the movie!" He imagines the cine-club being re-opened and the cast and crew coming back to life for the premiere of the film, which is titled "Why Don't You Play in Hell?". The audience applauds wildly. Back in reality, Hirata runs through the streets shouting "Fuck Bombers" until a voice (presumably Sion Sono's) yells to cut, and some crew members can be seen emerging in the background.

Cast
Jun Kunimura
Shinichi Tsutsumi
Fumi Nikaidō
Tak Sakaguchi
Tomochika
Hiroki Hasegawa
Gen Hoshino

Reception
At Metacritic, which assigns a normalized rating out of 100 to reviews from mainstream critics, the film has received an average score of 68, based on 11 reviews.

References

External links

 

2013 films
2013 action films
Japanese films about revenge
Films about filmmaking
Films about film directors and producers
Films directed by Sion Sono
Japanese action films
Self-reflexive films
Yakuza films
2010s Japanese films